Tyner High School is located in Chattanooga, Tennessee, United States. It was built in 1907 as the first secondary school in Hamilton County east of the Missionary Ridge at the site of the current Tyner Middle Academy. The first class consisted of 25 students. The school was moved to the current location, which has had many additions and changes since 1937. Today Tyner Academy serves around 876 students, in grades 9-12, in three Career Academies and a Freshman Academy.

The school colors are maroon and gold and the school mascot is the Ram

Tyner Academy is located at 6836 Tyner Road, Chattanooga, TN 37421.

Current administration and faculty
The school is currently governed by Principal Dr. Tiffany Ervin Ed.D , Assistant Principals Rachel (Goan) Turner, Ron Davis .  there are 29 full-time teachers at the school.

Academies
Each student at Tyner Academy belongs to one of four academies. All freshmen are a part of the Freshman Academy. During their first year, students learn about the three Career Academies (Science, Communication, and Engineering) in order to decide which they would like to belong to for their remaining three years. The purpose of the Career Academies is to prepare students for jobs in these fields.

Athletics
Tyner Academy's sports teams include:
 Football: Coach Chanler
 Baseball: Coach Flowers 
 Boys' basketball: Coach Ward  
 Girls' basketball: Coach Woerener  
 Cheerleading: Coach Gas
 Cross country
 Marching band: Mr. Critchfild
 Boys' soccer: Coach   
 Softball: Coach wright 
 Boys' track 
 Girls' track 
 Volleyball: Coach Woerner
 Wrestling : Coach Chanler

Demographics and statistics
Of the 575 students attending Tyner Academy, 52% are male and 48% are female. 96% are minorities. The student to teacher ratio is 13:1.

Milestones
Over the past 100 years, Tyner Academy has achieved many milestones under its 13 principals.

 September 9, 1907 – first day of school at Tyner Baptist Church, as the school building wasn't ready
 November 26, 1907 – dedication of the school
 1922 – Running water
 1924 – Electric lights
 1926 – Cafeteria added
 1931 – First choral and instrumental programs
 1937 – New building with classrooms, cafeteria, gymnasium, library and offices
 1942 – First yearbook, Talley Ho
 1946 — Tyner Memorial Field dedicated (inaugurating night football) 
 1955 – Ram became the official school mascot
 1958 – Ninth grade moved to the middle school
 1962 – Auditorium and annex added
 1967 – New football stadium constructed
 1974 – Annexed into city limits of Chattanooga and became part of Chattanooga City Schools
 1975 – New gymnasium built
 1981 – New vocational building constructed
 1984 – Montice B. Howard Library dedicated
 1986 – New cafeteria and science labs built
 1989 – Ninth grade returned
 1998 – Became part of Hamilton County Schools when Chattanooga City Schools was merged with the county school system
 1999 – Renamed Tyner Academy of Math, Science, and Technology
 1999 – First lottery students from magnet grant and science labs upgraded
 2004 – Second magnet grant awarded, implemented Career Academies
 2007 – 100-year anniversary
 2022 - Original building deconstructed for new Middle/High school.

References

External links
 Tyner Academy website
 Hamilton County website

Schools in Chattanooga, Tennessee
Public high schools in Tennessee
1907 establishments in Tennessee
Educational institutions established in 1907